During the 1936–37 season Hibernian, a football club based in Edinburgh, came seventeenth out of 20 clubs in the Scottish First Division.

Scottish First Division

Final League table

Scottish Cup

See also
List of Hibernian F.C. seasons

References

External links
Hibernian 1936/1937 results and fixtures, Soccerbase

Hibernian F.C. seasons
Hibernian